Abišala Cabinet was the 4th cabinet of Lithuania since 1990. It consisted of the Prime Minister and 18 government ministers.

History
Aleksandras Abišala was appointed the Prime Minister by the Supreme Council of Lithuania on 21 July 1992, after the previous government, headed by Gediminas Vagnorius, resigned amidst internal conflicts.

The government served until the elections in October 1992, which were won by the ex-communist Democratic Labour Party of Lithuania, resigning on 26 November 1992. The government continued to serve in an acting capacity  until Lubys Cabinet started its work on 17 December 1992.

Abišala Cabinet is remembered for unpopular decisions - cuts to public spending, fixed salaries and rising costs of utilities.

Cabinet
The following ministers served on the Abišala Cabinet.

References 

Cabinet of Lithuania
1992 establishments in Lithuania
1992 disestablishments in Lithuania
Cabinets established in 1992
Cabinets disestablished in 1992